Sahir Ali Bagga (born 10 April 1980) is a Pakistani singer, music director and composer from Lahore, who composes music for Lollywood and other independent singers.

Recently he has composed music for the Pakistani movie, Zinda Bhaag (2013). He also worked on the soundtrack of Pakistani movies, Hijrat (2016) and Tamanna (2014), contributing two songs to the latter; Koi Dil Mein and Chell Oi. He has also composed music of Hum TV's Ishq-e-Benaam. He gained some added recognition by appearing on Coke Studio (Pakistan). "Yeh mumkin tou nahin", "Malang", "Baazi","Rab Waaris", "Roye Roye " ,"Dhola" and "Badnamiyan" are his famous soundtracks.

Career
Sahir Ali Bagga is the son of the 1970s Pakistani music composer and drummer Amjad Hussain. He was musically trained by the musicians of the family of Ustad Tafu. Sahir Ali Bagga started in the music industry as a drummer and later joined the band Jupiters where he met music video singer Jawad Ahmad. He composed music for Ahmed's album and this helped Bagga find his career path, later on, Pakistan Army boosted his career by adopting him as an official singer of National Armed forces after Noor Jehan. He first received recognition and praise for his work and musical arrangements on Pakistan Television produced TV show named Virsa: Heritage Revived (2009–2010) TV season. On this show, he composed music for TV performances of Shafqat Amanat Ali Khan, Rahat Fateh Ali Khan, Azra Jehan, Sanam Marvi and many more performers. This highly popular TV show was hosted by Lahore's socially active personality Yousuf Salahuddin.

He also sang some popular TV dramas OSTs, such as one of the best O Rangreza (Hum TV), Iltija (Ary Digital TV), Khudgharz (ARY Digital), Intezaar (A plus TV) and many more. His recent OST for the TV drama O Rangreza received much recognition and was nominated for Lux Style Awards in 2018. He also sung the Ost of Bharosa Pyar Tera and wrote the lyrics for the OST of the hit drama Khaani.
He has also appeared in Coke Studio Pakistan (season 10) in a duet song with Aima Baig. In May 2021, he appeared in an upbeat, Punjabi song titled Badnamiyan, alongside Alizeh Shah.

Sahir Ali Bagga is quoted as saying, "I always want to make music that relates to my land, my culture and my home. Our raags, our beats, our lyrics – these are our own colors. I want to give my fans the kind of music that shows these colors".

Discography

Awards 
In 2020, the government of Pakistan awarded him the Pride of Performance Award in recognition of his music composition for "Bara Dushman Bana Phirta Hai", a march song originally released in December 2015 by the Inter-Services Public Relations on the first anniversary of 2014 Peshawar school massacre.

References

External links
 

1980 births
Living people
Pakistani record producers
Pakistani male singers
Pakistani composers
Musicians from Lahore
Coke Studio (Pakistani TV program)
Recipients of the Pride of Performance